Mario Zotta (6 November 1904 – 21 February 1963) was an Italian politician. Zotta was born in Pietragalla. He represented the Christian Democracy party in the Constituent Assembly of Italy from 1946 to 1948 and in the Senate of the Republic from 1948 to 1963.

References

1904 births
1963 deaths
People from the Province of Potenza
Christian Democracy (Italy) politicians
Government ministers of Italy
Members of the Constituent Assembly of Italy
Senators of Legislature I of Italy
Senators of Legislature II of Italy
Senators of Legislature III of Italy
Politicians of Basilicata